Bosnia and Herzegovina Republic League was the highest football league in Bosnia and Herzegovina within the Yugoslav football system. During the time of SFR Yugoslavia, it was the third level league for most of the time and the winner was usually promoted to the Yugoslav Second League.

Winners
In SFR Yugoslavia

Performance by club

Football leagues in Bosnia and Herzegovina
4
Defunct third level football leagues in Europe